Jerome Allen may refer to:

Jerome Allen (author) (1830–1894), American educator and author
Jerome Allen (basketball) (born 1973), American basketball coach and former player

See also
Allen (surname)